Park Hyung-sik (born November 16, 1991) is a South Korean actor, singer and dancer. After three years of training, he debuted as a member of the South Korean boy group ZE:A in 2010. As an actor, he is known for his roles in The Heirs (2013), High Society (2015), Hwarang: The Poet Warrior Youth (2016),  Strong Girl Bong-soon (2017), Happiness (2021) and Soundtrack #1 (2022). He also starred in films and musical theatre productions.

Life and career

1991–2009: Early life and training 
Park Hyung-sik was born on November 16, 1991, in Yongin, Gyeonggi Province, South Korea, as the second of two sons. His father is a member of the board of directors at BMW Korea, and his mother is a piano teacher. He was named Hyung-sik by a Buddhist monk, as his mother and grandmother are Buddhists. Park joined his school's band as a vocalist in middle school. They covered popular Korean contemporary artists such as Buzz and Flower. During Yongin's Youth Music Contest, his last competition with the band, Park received several business cards from different entertainment agencies and decided to audition with the support of his parents. He passed and began his training at the start of high school. Park said that he liked singing but struggled with dancing. After a year, Park followed his manager and joined Star Empire Entertainment, where he continued to train for two more years. Everyday, Park attended school in Yongin, commuted by bus to the agency located in Seoul to train, and returned home in the middle of the night.

As a trainee, Park featured in the music video of the 2009 single "Date" by labelmates Jewelry S and modeled for a school uniform brand. His first appearance as a member of Star Empire's boy group ZE:A was in Mnet's reality television series Star Empire, aired in April 2009. The series told the "behind-the-scenes stories" of the entertainment industry, focusing on the lives of the company's staff, managers, and trainees. In October 2009, Park appeared in a second Mnet series, Empire Kids Returns, documenting the group's street performances across South Korea staged to prepare for their upcoming debut.

2010–2014: ZE:A, acting debut, and rising popularity 

ZE:A debuted with their first single album Nativity on January 7, 2010. That year, he made cameo appearances in the television series Prosecutor Princess, Marry Me, Please, and Gloria. In 2011, Park began his theatrical career as a cast member alongside Super Junior's Ryeowook in the musical Temptation of Wolves.

He began his acting career in 2012, starring in SBS' special drama I Remember You. The same year, he starred in SBS' Dummy Mommy, where he played a vocalist of an indie band.

The following year, Park had a role in KBS2's drama special Sirius (2013), where he played the adolescent version of two twin brothers with starkly contrasting personalities. It was also in early 2013 when Park participated in his second musical theatre production, Gwanghwamun Love Song, playing the role of Ji-Yong.

In March 2013, Park, along with his fellow ZE:A members Siwan, Kevin, Minwoo and Dongjun formed the group's first sub-unit called ZE:A Five. He then featured in tvN's time-slip drama Nine as the younger version of Lee Jin-wook's character.

Park gained wider recognition after joining Real Men in June 2013, where he was nicknamed "Baby Soldier" for his innocent, yet passionate image.

In September 2013, Park was cast as Clyde in his third musical theatre production, Bonnie & Clyde. He followed this with a role in hit teen drama The Heirs (2013).

In early 2014, Park was cast for the role of D'Artagnan in his fourth musical production, The Three Musketeers. And in August of the same year, Park joined the main cast of the family drama What's With This Family (2014) as Cha Dal-bong, the youngest child who is struggling with finding a stable job.

2015–2020: Breakthrough and enlistment 
In 2015, Park was part of the main cast in SBS' romance drama High Society where he played the role of a chaebol who falls for a part-timer at the gourmet supermarket he manages. Park drew favorable reviews for his performance in the series, which led to increased popularity for the actor in Japan.

In the following year, Park was once again cast for the role of D'Artagnan in the 2016 musical production of The Three Musketeers. And in December 2016, he starred in the historical drama Hwarang: The Poet Warrior Youth, playing the role of Sammaekjong, a young and distrustful king.

In February 2017, Park starred in his first leading role in cable network JTBC's Strong Girl Bong-soon, playing the CEO of a game company, Ainsoft.  The romantic-comedy with Park Bo-young was a critical and commercial success, and became one of the highest rated Korean dramas in cable television history.  Park experienced a rise in popularity and received increased endorsement offers.

In April 2017, Park officially signed with United Artists Agency (UAA) after deciding not to renew with his former agency, Star Empire Entertainment. In December 2017, he starred in a romantic short film, Two Rays of Light alongside Han Ji-min.

In April 2018, Park starred in the Korean remake of American legal drama series Suits; portraying the Korean counterpart of Mike Ross. Following this, in November 2018, Park returned to the musical scene, playing the role of Der Tod in the stage production of Elisabeth.

In May 2019, Park made his feature film debut in the legal film Juror 8. This role won him the Best New Actor award at the 39th Korean Association of Film Critics Awards in November 2019. The role also earned him nominations for Best New Actor (Film) at the 40th Blue Dragon Film Awards and 56th Baeksang Arts Awards. Park began his mandatory military service on June 10, 2019. He entered the Nonsan Army Recruit Training Center in South Chungcheong Province to start his basic military training and will be completing the rest of his military duties in the military police department of the Capital Defense Command as an active duty soldier. Park had earlier revealed that he was inspired to join the Capital Defense Command after he received positive feedback for his shooting skills while training for the variety show, Real Man. The actor said that he wanted to put his skills to good use, so he is excited to join the unit and be of service to his country.

2021–present: Return to acting 
Following his military discharge in January 2021, Park starred in the apocalyptic city thriller Happiness as Jung Yi-hyun, an intelligent and honest violent crimes detective alongside Han Hyo-joo. Happiness recorded low television ratings and mixed reviews in South Korea.

The following year, Park starred in the four-episode musical romance Soundtrack #1. Park accepted the role in order to work with director Kim Hee-won and co-star Han So-hee. The actors' performances received mixed reviews; NME said that Park and Han "bring the lead characters to life with charming effortlessness" and Newsen stated that "it is thanks to Park Hyung-sik and Han So-hee that we want to keep watching the obvious unrequited romance", while the South China Morning Post opined that "neither of the stars can sell the romance". Park also appeared in the reality television series In the Soop: Friendcation with his group of celebrity friends, the "Wooga Squad", consisting of Park Seo-joon, V, Choi Woo-shik, and Peakboy. Park first met Park Seo-joon and V on the set of Hwarang; the former later introduced him to Choi Woo-shik and Peakboy.

Currently, Park stars as Lee Hwan, a cursed crown prince, in the television series Our Blooming Youth opposite Jeon So-nee.

Other ventures 
In October 2021, Park established his own management agency, P&Studio, together with some of his long-time managers as a subsidiary of his former agency, UAA. Actor Sung Yoo-bin and part of UAA's staff moved to P&Studio along Park. In August 2022, Gong Ji-ho, former member of girl group Oh My Girl, signed with the agency.

Discography

Soundtrack appearances

Songwriting credits 
All credits are adapted from the Korea Music Copyright Association.

Filmography

Film

Television series

Web series

Television shows

Music video appearances

Musical theatre

Ambassadorship 

 2012 Honorary Ambassador of Korea Tourism Organization
 2012 Brand Ambassador of Pret-a-Porter Busan (Busan Fashion Week)

Awards and nominations

Listicles

References

External links

Park Hyung-sik at the Korean Movie Database

Park Hyung-sik on Instagram

1991 births
Living people
K-pop singers
South Korean male idols
South Korean Buddhists
South Korean male singers
South Korean pop singers
South Korean dance musicians
South Korean male film actors
South Korean male television actors
South Korean male musical theatre actors
South Korean television personalities
People from Yongin
South Korean male stage actors